Sarani may refer to:

 Sarani, Iran
 Sarani, Dust Mohammad, Sistan and Baluchestan Province, Iran
 Sarani, Margan, Sistan and Baluchestan Province, Iran
 Mother Teresa Sarani or Park Street, a major thoroughfare in Kolkata, India 
 Sarani-ye Bala, Kerman Province, Iran
 Sarani-ye Pain, Kerman Province, Iran

See also 
 Šarani (disambiguation)